General Sir George Augustus Schomberg  (5 October 1821 – 5 December 1907) was a Royal Marines officer who served as Deputy Adjutant-General Royal Marines.

Military career
Born the son of Admiral Alexander Wilmot Schomberg, Schomberg was commissioned into the Royal Marine Artillery. He served in the Baltic Sea during the Crimean War and then commanded the Royal Marine Artillery in China during the Second Opium War.
 
He became colonel commandant of the Royal Marine Artillery on 10 April 1867 and then went on to be Deputy Adjutant-General Royal Marines (the professional head of the Royal Marines) in July 1872 before retiring in August 1875.

References

 

1821 births
1907 deaths
Royal Marines generals
Knights Commander of the Order of the Bath
British military personnel of the Crimean War
British military personnel of the Second Opium War